Ferran Park and the Alice McClelland Memorial Bandshell (also known as the Eustis Bandshell) is a historic site in Eustis, Florida. It is located at the junction of Ferran Park Road and Orange Avenue, on Lake Eustis. On June 23, 1994, it was added to the U.S. National Register of Historic Places. On July 6, 2005, it became a contributing property to the Eustis Commercial Historic District.

References

External links
 Lake County listings at National Register of Historic Places
 Florida's Office of Cultural and Historical Programs
 Lake County listings
 Ferran Park and the Alice B. McClelland Bandshell

National Register of Historic Places in Lake County, Florida
Eustis, Florida